ORDATA is a United States government database of landmines and other unexploded ordnance, developed to assist humanitarian demining work. The original version of ORDATA released in 1997 was CD-ROM based, and incorporated material from the earlier Minefacts program. ORDATA 2.0 was distributed on a CD-ROM and on the Internet.  The database is hosted on the Center for International Stabilization and Recovery website, a part of James Madison University.  In 2014-15 the interface underwent a revision and the data partially updated. The new site is known as the Collaborative ORDnance Data Repository (CORD) and is available online at https://www.jmu.edu/cisr/research/cord.shtml. An offline version is in development.

References

External links
 Collaborative ORDnance Data Repository
 Center for International Stabilization and Recovery
 James Madison University

Mine warfare
Mine action